The Four-man bobsleigh competition at the 1998 Winter Olympics in Nagano was held on 22 and 23 February, at Spiral. Weather led to the cancellation of the second run on the opening day, meaning the competition had three total runs.

Results

References

External links
Wallechinsky, David and Jaime Loucky (1998). "Bobsleigh: Two-Man". In The Complete Book of the Winter Olympics: 2010 Edition. London: Aurum Press Limited. pp. 159–60.

Bobsleigh at the 1998 Winter Olympics